Modern Dowry is a 1932 German comedy film directed by E. W. Emo and starring Mártha Eggerth, Georg Alexander, and Leo Slezak. It was shot at the Johannisthal Studios in Berlin. The film's sets were designed by the art director Otto Hunte.

Cast

References

Bibliography 
 Klaus, Ulrich J. Deutsche Tonfilme: Jahrgang 1932. Klaus-Archiv, 1988.

External links

1932 comedy films
Films of the Weimar Republic
German comedy films
Films directed by E. W. Emo
German black-and-white films
1930s German films
1930s German-language films
Films shot at Johannisthal Studios